The men's 400 metres at the 2017 World Championships in Athletics was held at the London Olympic Stadium on 5, 6, and 8 August.

Summary
Isaac Makwala (Botswana) had qualified for the final, but was barred from competing as he was under quarantine due to the norovirus outbreak in one of the athletes' hotels. Steven Gardiner (Bahamas) started fastest, with Wayde van Niekerk (South Africa) equal to him by about 200 metres, and going on to build a lead through the final turn. Van Niekerk had time to slow down, winning comfortably ahead of Gardiner, with Abdalelah Haroun (Qatar) finishing quickly from dead last off the turn to claim bronze.

Records
Before the competition records were as follows:

The following records were set at the competition:

Qualification standard
The standard to qualify automatically for entry was 45.50.

Schedule
The event schedule, in local time (UTC+1), was as follows:

Results

Heats
The first round took place on 5 August in six heats as follows:

The first three in each heat ( Q ) and the next six fastest ( q ) qualified for the semifinals. The overall results were as follows:

Semifinals
The semifinals took place on 6 August in three heats as follows:

The first two in each heat ( Q ) and the next two fastest ( q ) qualified for the final. The overall results were as follows:

Final
The final took place on 8 August at 21:54. The results were as follows (photo finish):

References

400
400 metres at the World Athletics Championships